Cis rotundulus is a species of minute tree-fungus beetle in the family Ciidae. It is found in western Europe.

References 

Ciidae
Beetles described in 1793